Discography for the American jazz record label Impulse! Records. Original releases had the A- prefix for the mono release and AS- for the stereo.

Discography

Original series

1987-present
Teodross Avery
1995: My Generation

Black Note
1995: Nothin' but the Swing

Henry Butler
1987: The Village (with Ron Carter, Jack DeJohnette, John Purcell, Alvin Batiste, Bob Stewart)
Michael Brecker
1987: Michael Brecker
1988: Don't Try This at Home
1996: Tales from the Hudson
1998: Two Blocks from the Edge

Alice Coltrane
2004: Translinear Light

Jack DeJohnette
1987: Irresistible Forces
1988: Audio-Visualscapes

Donald Harrison
1996: Nouveau Swing
1997: Free to Be

Henry Johnson
1986: You're the One
1988: Future Excursions

Diana Krall
1996: All for You: a Dedication to the Nat King Cole Trio 
1997: Love Scenes 
1998: Have Yourself a Merry Little Christmas

Machito
1988: Machito & His Salsa Big Band

Russell Malone
1998: Sweet Georgia Peach

Andrea Motis
2017: Emotional Dance

Danilo Pérez
1996: Panamonk

Eric Reed
1996: Musicale

Horace Silver
 1996: The Hardbop Grandpop
 1997: A Prescription for the Blues

Sons of Kemet
2018: Your Queen Is a Reptile
2021: Black to the Future

Greg Tardy
1997: Serendipity 

The Comet is Coming
2019: Trust in the Lifeforce of the Deep Mystery

McCoy Tyner
1987: Blues for Coltrane
1995: Infinity
1997: What the World Needs Now
2001: McCoy Tyner Plays John Coltrane

Various artists
1998: Jazz Underground: Live at Smalls

References

External links
 

Impulse! Records albums
Discographies of American record labels